Glenn Alinskie (born 19 October 1988),  is an Indonesian actor. He is known for his numerous roles in soap operas.

Biography
Glenn Alinskie was born in Jakarta on 19 October 1988 and is of Thai-Chinese-Indonesian ancestry. He is a Roman Catholic. Alinskie portrayed the main cast role of Ello in the sinetron (Indonesian soap opera) Intan, as well as its Korean drama adaptation, and the male lead role of Moses in Buku Harian Nayla with Chelsea Olivia. He married Chelsea Olivia on 3 October 2015, and they welcomed their first child, a daughter, on September 9, 2016.

Soap Opera

References

External links 
 

Living people
1988 births
Male actors from Jakarta
Indonesian male television actors
Indonesian Roman Catholics
Indonesian people of Chinese descent
Indonesian people of Thai descent